James Gordon Frierson (1835 - 1884) was a state representative in Arkansas in 1871 and was re-elected for a second term. He also served at the 1874 Arkansas Constitutional Convention. He established a high school. He was elected a judge. He married and had 3 children.

He grew up in Mississippi and served in the Confederate Army during the American Civil War.

References

1835 births
1884 deaths
African-American politicians during the Reconstruction Era
Members of the Arkansas House of Representatives
People from Mississippi
African Americans in the American Civil War